Riolama luridiventris is a species of lizard in the family Gymnophthalmidae. It is endemic to Venezuela.

References

Riolama
Reptiles of Venezuela
Endemic fauna of Venezuela
Reptiles described in 2004
Taxa named by Luis Felipe Esqueda
Taxa named by Enrique La Marca
Taxa named by María José Praderio